The WDM-1 was the first class of Wide Gauge (W), Diesel powered (D), Mixed load (M), meant for hauling both freight and passenger trains. These are also the first mainline diesel engines imported after Independence. They were even the fastest diesel locomotives till the advent of WDM 2 and WDM 4. They used to haul ore/freight trains on SER. In the end, they were relegated to shunting/piloting duties or hauling sugarcane freight trains. One unit, #17000, is preserved at National Rail Museum, Delhi.

WDM-1 
 All locomotives of this class have been withdrawn from service.

Trains hauled by WDM-1
 Howrah–Chennai Mail

See also

 Indian Railways
List of diesel locomotives of India
Indian locomotive class WDM-2

References

M-1
Co-Co locomotives
ALCO locomotives
Railway locomotives introduced in 1957
5 ft 6 in gauge locomotives
A1A-A1A locomotives